Harpalus distinguendus is a species of ground beetle in the subfamily Harpalinae. It was described by Duftschmid in 1812.

References

distinguendus
Beetles described in 1812